In statistics relating to national economies, the indexation of contracts also called "index linking" and "contract escalation" is a procedure when a contract includes a periodic adjustment to the prices paid for the contract provisions based on the level of a nominated price index. The purpose of indexation is to readjust contracts to account for inflation. In the United States, the consumer price index (CPI), producer price index (PPI), and, in the U.S., Employment Cost Index (ECI) are the most frequently used indexes.

See also
 Indexation
 Purchasing power
 Bureau of Labor Statistics

References

External links
 Contract escalation in glossary, U.S. Bureau of Labor Statistics Division of Information Services
 INDEXATION OF CONTRACTS, Glossary of Statistical Terms
 Contract Escalation

Social statistics
Economic data